Bergiaria westermanni is a species of long-whiskered catfish native to the Das Velhas River basin in Brazil as well as being reported to occur in Argentina and Uruguay.  This species grows to a length of  SL.

References
 

Pimelodidae
Fish of South America
Fish of Argentina
Fish of Brazil
Fish of Uruguay
Taxa named by Christian Frederik Lütken
Fish described in 1874